Herbert Nickal Haresnape (2 July 1880 – 17 December 1962) was an English competitive swimmer from West Derby, who represented Great Britain in two Olympic Games in the early 1900s.

At the 1908 Summer Olympics in London, he won a bronze medal in the men's 100-metre backstroke.  Four years later at the 1912 Summer Olympics in Stockholm, he advanced to the semifinals in 100-metre backstroke.

See also
 List of Olympic medalists in swimming (men)

References

External links
Herbert Haresnape's profile at databaseOlympics

1880 births
1962 deaths
English male swimmers
Male backstroke swimmers
Olympic swimmers of Great Britain
Swimmers at the 1908 Summer Olympics
Swimmers at the 1912 Summer Olympics
Olympic bronze medallists for Great Britain
Sportspeople from Liverpool
Olympic bronze medalists in swimming
Medalists at the 1908 Summer Olympics